Mario Semenzato (born 15 July 1950) is an Italian former rower. He competed in the men's coxed pair event at the 1972 Summer Olympics.

References

External links
 

1950 births
Living people
Italian male rowers
Olympic rowers of Italy
Rowers at the 1972 Summer Olympics
People from Terracina
Sportspeople from the Province of Latina